Russell Paul Springer (born November 7, 1968) is a former Major League Baseball relief pitcher. Springer made his major league debut on April 17, with the New York Yankees. He also pitched for the California Angels, Philadelphia Phillies, Arizona Diamondbacks, Atlanta Braves, Houston Astros, St. Louis Cardinals, Oakland Athletics, and Cincinnati Reds. He was a member of the Arizona Diamondbacks when they won the 2001 World Series, and was a member of the Houston Astros when they went to the World Series in 2005.

College
Springer attended Louisiana State University.

Professional career
Springer was drafted by the New York Yankees in the 7th round of the 1989 Major League Baseball Draft and signed with the Yankees immediately after the draft in June 1989. On December 6, 1992, Springer was traded by the Yankees with J. T. Snow and Jerry Nielsen to the California Angels for Jim Abbott. On August 15, 1995, he was traded by the Angels with Kevin Flora to the Phillies for Dave Gallagher. In the 1996–97 offseason, he signed with the Houston Astros.

In the 1997 MLB expansion draft, Springer was chosen by the Arizona Diamondbacks. On June 23, 1998, he was traded by the Diamondbacks to the Atlanta Braves for Alan Embree. In Atlanta, he picked up the win in game six of the 1999 NLCS, which clinched the pennant for the Braves. After the 1999 season, he signed with the Diamondbacks. He signed as a free agent with the Cardinals in the 2002–03 offseason, and with the Astros in 2004.

Springer was involved in a May 16, incident in a game between the Astros and the San Francisco Giants with Barry Bonds. Bonds, with 713 career home runs at the time (one short of tying Babe Ruth for second on the career home runs list), was hit by a Springer pitch in the shoulder. Springer was then ejected along with Astros manager Phil Garner. He received an ovation from Astros fans as he left the field, leading to criticism from Giants manager Felipe Alou and broadcaster Jon Miller that the ovation was in bad taste. Springer was suspended for four games and Garner one game for the incident.

Springer was again signed by the Cardinals before the 2007 season. In , he was 8–1 with an ERA of 2.18 with the Cardinals. On January 29, Springer signed with the Oakland Athletics. On August 8, 2009, he was claimed off waivers by the Tampa Bay Rays.

On July 15, 2010, Springer signed with the Cincinnati Reds. The agreement called for Springer to join the Reds' Triple-A team, the Louisville Bats, for a prep assignment prior to possibly joining the Reds. The Reds' general manager, Walt Jocketty, was also the general manager for the Cardinals during Springer's two stints there. On August 2, 2010, Springer was called up by the Reds from Louisville, replacing Carlos Fisher on the active roster.

Springer retired on January 30, 2011.

References

External links

Russ Springer player profile page at stlcardinals.scout.com

1968 births
Living people
Major League Baseball pitchers
Baseball players from Louisiana
LSU Tigers baseball players
New York Yankees players
California Angels players
Philadelphia Phillies players
Houston Astros players
Arizona Diamondbacks players
Atlanta Braves players
Cincinnati Reds players
St. Louis Cardinals players
Oakland Athletics players
Tampa Bay Rays players
Columbus Clippers players
Louisville Bats players
Richmond Braves players
Tucson Sidewinders players
Memphis Redbirds players
New Orleans Zephyrs players
Sportspeople from Alexandria, Louisiana
People from Pollock, Louisiana
Albany-Colonie Yankees players
Fort Lauderdale Yankees players
Gulf Coast Yankees players
Greensboro Hornets players
Jackson Generals (Texas League) players
Vancouver Canadians players
American expatriate baseball players in Canada
Anchorage Glacier Pilots players